Anna of Foix-Candale (1484 – 26 July 1506) was Queen of Hungary and Bohemia as the third wife of King Vladislaus II.

Biography
Anne was the daughter of Gaston of Foix, Count of Candale and Infanta Catherine of Navarre. Her mother was the youngest daughter of Queen Eleanor of Navarre and Gaston IV, Count of Foix. Anne grew up at the French royal court at Blois. She was educated in Latin and the Classics. 

Louis I d'Orléans, Duke of Longueville, first cousin once removed of King Louis XII of France, is reported to have been in love with her and wished to marry her, but he was prevented from doing so because an illustrious political marriage was planned for Anne. The elderly, twice-divorced and childless king Vladislaus II of Hungary of the Jagiellon dynasty had been searching for a wife capable of giving him a son. His sights were set on a powerful alliance, and Anne, a member of the upper nobility of France related to several royal families, was a good choice. Anne was betrothed in 1500, a marriage contract was confirmed in 1501, and she wed Vladislaus by proxy at the French court at Blois in 1502. On her way to Hungary, she was much celebrated in Venice and other parts of Italy, causing a conflict between France and Hungary over who should pay the expenses. On 29 September 1502, Anne wed Vladislaus, this time in Székesfehérvár and she was crowned Queen of Hungary there that same day.

Anne brought some members of the French court as well as French advisors with her to Hungary. The relationship was happy at least from the king's view, and he is reported to have regarded her as a friend, assistant and a trusted advisor. She incurred debts in Venice and was said to favour this city all her life. In 1506, her signature was placed on a document alongside the king's regarding an alliance with the Habsburgs. On July 23, 1503 Anne gave birth to a daughter, known as Anna Jagellonica, and on July 1, 1506 to the long-awaited male heir, the future king Louis II. She enjoyed great popularity, but her pregnancies ruined her health. She died in Buda on July 26, 1506, a little more than three weeks after the birth of her son due to complications from delivery. She was 22.

Children
Although Anna was Vladislaus II's third wife, she gave birth to his only surviving legitimate children, both of whom were born in Buda:

 Anna of Bohemia and Hungary, later Queen consort of Hungary and Bohemia. Married Ferdinand I, Holy Roman Emperor, and they inherited Bohemia and what was left of Hungary.
 Louis II of Hungary, born on July 1, 1506, killed at the Battle of Mohács on August 29, 1526. Married Mary of Habsburg; their marriage was childless, although he fathered illegitimate issue.

Ancestry

References

Sources

Further reading

Anthony, Raoul: Identification et Etude des Ossements des Rois de Navarre inhumés dans la Cathédrale de Lescar (Identification and Study of the Bones of the Kings of Navarre buried at the Cathedral of Lescar). Paris. Masson. 1931
Birkás, Géza: Francia utazók Magyarországon (French Travellers in Hungary). Acta Universitatis Szegediensis: Sectio philologica, Tomus 16. Szeged. 228 pp. 1948
Byrne, Francis John: Irish Kings and High-Kings. London: Batsford. 1973 
Dobosy, Tibor: Pierre Choque, Anna magyar királyné francia kísérője (Pierre Choque, The French Attendant of Hungarian Queen Anne). Budapest. 1940
Fógel, József: II. Ulászló udvartartása (The Court of Vladislaus II) (1490–1516). MTA (The Hungarian Academy of Science). Budapest. 166 pp. 1913
Kšír, Josef: K původu české královny Anny (To the Origin of Bohemian Queen Anne). Genealogické a heraldické listy (GaHL) (Genealogical and Heraldical Lists) 21. 40-47. Prague. 2001
Macek, Josef: Tři ženy krále Vladislava (The Three Wives of King Vladislaus). Prague. Mladá fronta. 1991
Marczali, Henrik: Candalei Anna II. Ulászló neje, magyarországi útjának és a menyegzői ünnepélyek leírása (Közlemények a párisi Nemzeti könyvtárból 1448-1596, 83-122) (The Description of the Route to Hungary and the Wedding of Anne of Foix, the Wife of Vladislaus II. Announcements from the National Library of Paris in French 1448-1596). Magyar Történelmi Tár (Hungarian Historical Journal) 23. 97-113. 1877
Solymosi, László (ed.): Magyarország történeti kronológiája I. A kezdetektől 1526-ig (The Historical Chronology of Hungary. From the Beginnings to 1526). főszerk. (editor-in-chief): Kálmán Benda. Budapest. 1981
Váralljai Csocsány, Jenő: A magyar monarchia és az európai reneszánsz Kráter Egyesület Kiadó, 2005
Wenzel, Gusztáv: II. Ulászló magyar és cseh királynak házas élete (The Marriages of Vladislaus II, King of Hungary and Bohemia). Századok (Periodical Centuries). 631-641, 727-757 és 816-840. 1877

|-

1484 births
1506 deaths
15th-century Hungarian nobility
16th-century Hungarian nobility
Bohemian queens consort
Burials at the Basilica of the Assumption of the Blessed Virgin Mary
Deaths in childbirth
House of Foix
Hungarian people of British descent
Hungarian people of French descent
Hungarian queens consort
15th-century Hungarian people
15th-century Hungarian women
16th-century Hungarian people
16th-century Hungarian women
15th-century Bohemian people
15th-century Bohemian women
16th-century Bohemian people
16th-century Bohemian women